This is a list of the National Register of Historic Places listings in Chisago County, Minnesota.  It is intended to be a complete list of the properties and districts on the National Register of Historic Places in Chisago County, Minnesota, United States.  The locations of National Register properties and districts for which the latitude and longitude coordinates are included below, may be seen in an online map.

There are 18 properties and districts listed on the National Register in the county.  A supplementary list includes three additional sites that were formerly listed on the National Register.

History
Chisago County's National Register properties reflect its role as an early focus of Euro-American settlement in Minnesota and its evolving land use.  An intensive logging industry beginning in the 1830s gave way to agriculture, spurred by railroad access and increased European immigration—particularly Swedish immigration—by the 1870s.  Several properties reflect the prosperity achieved by several individuals of this period in the county's booming trackside towns.  Around the beginning of the 20th century, Chisago County developed a modest resort and tourism industry.

Current listings

|}

Former listings

|}

See also
 List of National Historic Landmarks in Minnesota
 National Register of Historic Places listings in Minnesota

References

External links

 Chisago County Historical Society

Chisago County